Czerniewice  is a village in Tomaszów Mazowiecki County, Łódź Voivodeship, in central Poland. It is the seat of the gmina (administrative district) called Gmina Czerniewice. It was probably founded in the 14th century.

In 2004 the village had a population of 730.

References

External links
Czerniewice (in Polish)

Czerniewice
Piotrków Governorate
Łódź Voivodeship (1919–1939)